Direct-to-fan is a business model used by independent musicians, independent music labels, music marketing professionals, promoters, and others in the music industry.  Direct-to-fan is also becoming a model used by the broad definition of artists, including comedians, visual artists, and other entertainers looking to build and leverage a fan community throughout their career.

The direct-to-fan model bypasses the major record label model that historically controlled radio, venue, and distribution channels, and lets the artist (or the team that supports that musician) create interest in their music directly with their fans, identify those fans, market directly to and develop relationships with those fans, sell directly to and monetize those relationships, and use those relationships to expand their fan base.

Foundation components of this model include music discovery sites, and direct-to-fan music sales, marketing, and business solutions.

Direct-to-fan models encourage engaging directly between the artist and their fans, keeping the fans engaged, knowing who they are (who, what, when, where, why), building the artist's brand, and developing the artist-to-fan relationship over time.

Background
An early example of this method in the music industry was by the British rock band Marillion, who used the internet to connect with their fans to finance a North American tour in 1997 and a subsequent album in 2001, instead of signing to a record label. In 2008, Alexis Petridis described the band in The Guardian as "the undisputed pioneers" of this practice. It was also addressed by Michael Lewis in his book Next: The Future Just Happened.

Tools
Some tools supporting direct-to-fan include: storefronts to sell direct-to-fan on band websites and on social networking sites such as Facebook or MySpace, Widget tools to embed sales, gig or event calendar, profile info anywhere including blogs, Marketing tools such as email marketing and messaging, Event tools, Central Content Management tools, Central Catalog Management tools for both digital and physical products, and digital delivery platforms that make it easy for you to sell direct from your website or social media by integrating with payment gateways, providing a checkout and automatically delivering music to fans via a download link.

Sales, marketing, and business solutions
More complete, one-place-to-manage-everything direct-to-fan solutions are beginning to emerge.  They help the artist's team with fan management, brand management, sales, marketing, distribution, manufacturing, event management, merchandizing, warehousing, fulfillment, and more, all from one dashboard.

Solution example
An example of a direct-to-fan solution would have online storefronts for their official band websites, Facebook, MySpace, blogs, etc.; Marketing solutions for email marketing, fan capture, fan messaging, and fan management; Label services including digital distribution to iTunes, Amazon, and other retail sites, CD and DVD manufacturing, custom merch, print services, graphic design and web services, warehousing and fulfilment, backend ecommerce and payment processing, and more.

Core applications that assist musicians in implementing a direct-to-fan approach include:

 Fan community platforms
Band website and storefronts
 digital delivery companies
 CD/DVD manufacturing
 Digital music distribution
 Download cards
 E-tickets and mobile-tickets
 Fan email marketing and messaging
 Fan marketing solutions
 Merchandise
 Music discovery
 Music festival submissions
 Payment processing
 Physical warehousing and fulfillment
 Poster and print services
 Storefronts
 Pre-sale ticket and album options
 Integration of social sites, such as Facebook and Twitter
 Fan-funding capabilities

Companies that are delivering portions of the above direct-to-fan solution include:

Bandcamp, Bandsintown, Shopify, Cafe Press, CD Baby, Constant Contact, Music Glue, Nimbit, NoiseTrade, Pledgemusic, ReverbNation, TuneCore, Zazzle, GigRev.

See also
Crowdfunding
Fan-funded music

References

Mike King, NARM / A2IM Keynote "Direct to Fan: From Foundation to Execution" 5 October 2011
Carl Jacobson, ASCAP "Direct-to-Fan: Hitting Your True Potential" 12/2010
Bob Lefsetz, Today's Music Business Paradigm, 12/17/10
Nimbit, Direct-to-Fan University, 06/01/10
Solutions for Dreamers, "Comparing Services of Direct-to-Fan Platforms" 04/12/10
Hype Genius, Direct-to-Fan Solution Analysis, 04/12/10
Rick Goetz, Musician Coaching, "Direct-to-Fan Strategies" 12/23/09
Michael Corcoran, American Statesman, Austin360, 10/01/09
Bruce Houghton, Hypebot Blog, 09/16/09
Laurence Tiffon, The Value of a Fan, 09/30/09
Michael Masnick, Techdirt, 08/28/09
Jason Feinberg, PBS Mediashift, 08/18/09
Mike King, 8/31/09, AmericanSongwriter.com
Jason Feinberg, PBS Mediashift, 06/24/09
Bruce Houghton, WebProNews.com, 5/4/09
Mike King, Berklee Music Blog, 04/16/09
Rueters/Billboard, Direct to Fan Presence, 03/26/07

Music industry